Carex chathamica is a species of sedge in the family Cyperaceae, native to the Chatham Islands of New Zealand. Grey-backed storm petrels (Garrodia nereis) nest in its tufts.

References

chathamica
Flora of the Chatham Islands
Plants described in 1914